Yunnanolepididae is an extinct family of primitive Antiarch placoderms characterized by having short, broad skull roofs, and by having a feature on the visceral side of the posterior medial dorsal plate, the crista transversalis interna posterior, which is diagnostic of antiarchs, turning forward, and lying in front of the posterior ventral process and pit (with this position being diagnostic of yunnanolepids in particular).

At least three genera, Yunnanolepis, Phymolepis, and Vukhuclepis are confirmed to have a unique organ called the "Chang's Apparatus," named in honor of Professor Meemann Chang, which is an internal cavity with an external opening within the suture of the anterior dorsal lateral plate and the anterior ventral lateral plate. The other genera in Yunnanolepidae that are not confirmed to have the Chang's Apparatus are included in the family because of anatomical similarities to Yunnanolepis.

The fossils of the various genera are found in Early to Middle Devonian strata in Southern China and Middle Devonian strata in Vietnam.

References

Prehistoric fish of Asia
Antiarchi
Fossils of China
Fossils of Vietnam
Placoderm families
Early Devonian first appearances
Middle Devonian extinctions